David Mendes da Silva (born 11 October 1986) is a footballer as a winger for US Mondorf in Luxembourg.

He began his career at Porto, where he did not make the first team, and also played in Bulgaria, Scotland, Spain, Finland, Thailand and Luxembourg.

Born in Portugal to Cape Verdean parents, he earned seven caps for Cape Verde at full international level. He was part of their squad that reached the quarter-finals of the 2013 Africa Cup of Nations.

Club career 
After spending the first three years of his career in his home country with Porto B and Tourizense, Silva relocated to Bulgaria in June 2008, signing a three-year contract with Lokomotiv Mezdra. He played 15 games in the Bulgarian first division, scoring two goals.

He left in January 2009 for CSKA Sofia along with teammate Rui Miguel. In January 2010, he was transferred to CD Castellón for the remainder of the season. On 23 June 2010, his contract with CSKA was terminated by mutual consent.

On 1 August 2010, Silva signed a two-year deal with Kilmarnock after impressing as a trialist in pre-season. He was Mixu Paatelainen's first signing as manager.

Silva spent the 2012–13 season in Portugal, at Olhanense. On his second Primeira Liga appearance, he scored his only goal to equalise in a 1–1 draw at Académica de Coimbra on 24 August.

Silva returned to Kilmarnock on 26 September 2013, signing until the end of the season. After failing to prove his fitness, he was released in January 2014.

After spells in Finland's Veikkausliiga with FF Jaro and in Thailand with Bangkok F.C. and Songkhla United, Silva signed for US Mondorf-les-Bains in the Luxembourg National Division in June 2019.

International career
In October 2012, Silva received his first call up for the Cape Verdean national team, for a 2013 Africa Cup of Nations qualifying match against Cameroon on 14 October.

Silva was called up for the 2013 Africa Cup of Nations, his country's first major tournament. He made one appearance in the opening game, as a 76th-minute substitute for Héldon Ramos in a goalless draw against hosts South Africa.

References

External links

1986 births
Living people
Sportspeople from Coimbra
Cape Verdean footballers
Cape Verde international footballers
Association football midfielders
FC Porto players
PFC Lokomotiv Mezdra players
G.D. Tourizense players
PFC CSKA Sofia players
CD Castellón footballers
Kilmarnock F.C. players
S.C. Olhanense players
FF Jaro players
David Silva
David Silva
US Mondorf-les-Bains players
First Professional Football League (Bulgaria) players
Scottish Premier League players
Scottish Professional Football League players
Segunda División players
Primeira Liga players
Veikkausliiga players
Luxembourg National Division players
Cape Verdean expatriate footballers
Expatriate footballers in Bulgaria
Cape Verdean expatriate sportspeople in Bulgaria
Expatriate footballers in Scotland
Expatriate footballers in Spain
Cape Verdean expatriate sportspeople in Spain
Cape Verdean expatriate sportspeople in Finland
Expatriate footballers in Finland
Cape Verdean expatriate sportspeople in Thailand
Expatriate footballers in Thailand
Expatriate footballers in Luxembourg
Portuguese people of Cape Verdean descent
2013 Africa Cup of Nations players